This is a list of Doraemon soundtrack albums in Doraemon series, which was released in Japan by the years.

Overall

List

Nobita to Animaru Puranetto Soundtrack

Doraemon 20th Anniversary - Dora The Best

Doraemon Song Soundtrack History

Boku Doraemon ~Doraemon Song Collection~

Dora the Movie 25th - Doraemon Movie Song Collection

Doraemon Animation Soundtrack

Doraemon BGM Collection Anime Music soundtrack

Doraemon To Nakamatachi Song Collection

Doraemon uta no dai kōshin

Doraemon Eigo no Uta

Doraemon TV Soundtrack Collection

Doraemon Soundtrack History 2

Doraemon Twin Best

Stand by Me Doraemon Original Soundtrack

Doraemon Main Theme Song Collection

References

Anime soundtracks
Soundtrack Albums
Nippon Columbia soundtracks
Universal Music Japan
Lists of soundtracks